Schokland is a former island in the Dutch Zuiderzee, in the municipality of Noordoostpolder. Schokland was an elongated strip of peat land which ceased to be an island when the Noordoostpolder was reclaimed from the sea in 1942. It is now just a slightly elevated part of the polder, with a still partly intact retaining wall of the waterfront of Middelbuurt. On 1 April 2014, it had 8 inhabitants, but according to Statistics Netherlands there are five people living on the former island.

History

Schokland was an attractive settlement area in the Middle Ages when it was much larger. By the 19th century, it was under continuous threat of flooding due to the rise in sea level. By then the Schoklanders had retreated to the three most elevated parts: Emmeloord, Molenbuurt, and Middelbuurt. A major flood in 1825 brought massive destruction, and in 1859 the government decided to end permanent settlement on Schokland. The former municipality of Schokland was joined to Kampen on the mainland.

Schokland was the first UNESCO World Heritage Site in the Netherlands.

Public transportation

The nearest railway stations are in Kampen and Dronten.

Bus service 682 operates from Kampen and serves Schokland.

References

External links
 
 
 

Ghost towns in Europe
World Heritage Sites in the Netherlands
Former islands of the Netherlands
Former populated places in the Netherlands
Archaeological sites in the Netherlands
Open-air museums in the Netherlands
Archaeological museums in the Netherlands
Former municipalities of Overijssel
Geography of Flevoland
History of Flevoland
Museums in Flevoland
Noordoostpolder